The  Andaman giant gecko (Gekko verreauxi), also known commonly as the Andamanese giant gecko, is a species of lizard in the family Gekkonidae. The species is indigenous to the Andaman Islands

Etymology
The specific name, verreauxi, is in honor of French naturalist Jules Verreaux.

Geographic range
G. verreauxi is endemic to the Andaman Islands of India.

Description
Reaching a total length (including tail) of more than one foot (30 cm), the Andaman giant gecko is one of the world's largest geckos.

Habitat
G. verreauxi is commonly found on trees, tree logs, and in crop fields.

Behaviour
G. verreauxi hides by day in cavities or under bark plates of trees (typically Manilkara litoralis), and comes out after sunset to prey on insects. It is shy and well camouflaged.

Reproduction
G. verreauxi is oviparous.

References

Further reading
Ota H, Hikida T, Matsui M (1991). "Re-evaluation of the Status of Gekko verreauxi Tytler, 1864, from the Andaman Islands, India". Journal of Herpetology 25 (2): 147–151.
Rösler H (2000). "Kommentierte Liste der rezent, subrezent und fossil bekannten Geckotaxa (Reptilia: Gekkonomorpha)". Gekkota 2: 28–153. (Gekko verreauxi, p. 82). (in German).

verreauxi
Reptiles of India
Endemic fauna of the Andaman Islands
Reptiles described in 1865
Taxa named by Robert Christopher Tytler